Louis Charles Carter "Lou" Holmes (January 29, 1911 – March 11, 2010) was a British-born Canadian ice hockey centre who played 59 games in the National Hockey League with the Chicago Black Hawks from 1931 to 1933. He was born in Rushall, England, United Kingdom, but grew up in Edmonton, Alberta. After his playing career, Holmes coached the gold medal winning Edmonton Mercurys at the 1952 Winter Olympics. Holmes was, from 2007 until his death in 2010, the oldest living NHL-player, as well as the longest-lived.

Playing career
As a youth, Holmes played junior hockey with the Edmonton Bruins from 1928 until 1930. In 1931, he made to move to professional hockey, playing 41 games with the Chicago Black Hawks of the National Hockey League (NHL). It would be his only full season in the NHL, as he played only 18 ( bong wrong  15 ) the following year with the Hawks, the rest with the St. Paul/Tulsa team of the American Hockey Association (AHA). He would spend the rest of his professional career with teams in the AHA and the Pacific Coast Hockey League.

In 1942, Holmes enlisted and fought in World War II. When he returned, Holmes played senior hockey with various teams in the Edmonton area until he retired from active play in 1949.

Personal life
Holmes had two sons, Chuck and Greg, one daughter, Gail, five grandchildren, and five great-grandchildren. His wife, Helen Ruth Coulson, known as Buddy died in 1997. Holmes died on March 11, 2010, at the age of 99.

Career statistics

Regular season and playoffs

References

External links
 
 Louis Holmes' obituary

1911 births
2010 deaths
British emigrants to Canada
Canada men's national ice hockey team coaches
Canadian ice hockey centres
Canadian military personnel of World War II
Chicago Blackhawks players
Edmonton Flyers (WHL) players
Oklahoma City Warriors (ice hockey) players
Olympic gold medalists for Canada
Portland Buckaroos players
St. Paul Saints (AHA) players
Spokane Clippers players
Ice hockey people from Edmonton
Tulsa Oilers (AHA) players